John Cormack (born 1964) is an Irish retired hurler. His league and championship career with the Tipperary senior team lasted the 1988-89 season.

Born in Loughmore, County Tipperary, Cormack came to prominence as a hurler and Gaelic footballer with Templemore CBS. He first appeared for the Loughmore–Castleiney club at juvenile and underage levels, before eventually joining the club's senior teams as a dual player. During a successful club career, Cormack won three county championship medals in both codes.

Cormack made his debut on the inter-county scene when he was selected for the Tipperary minor team in 1981. He enjoyed two championship seasons with the minor team, culminating with the winning of an All-Ireland medal in 1982. He subsequently joined the under-21 team, winning an All-Ireland medals in 1985. Cormack joined the Tipperary senior team during the 1987-88 league. That season he won his sole All-Ireland medal, as well as a Munster medal.

Honours

Loughmore–Castleiney
Tipperary Senior Football Championship (2): 1987, 1992
Tipperary Senior Hurling Championship (1): 1988

Tipperary
All-Ireland Senior Hurling Championship (1): 1989
Munster Senior Hurling Championship (1): 1989

References

1964 births
Living people
Loughmore-Castleiney Gaelic footballers
Loughmore-Castleiney hurlers
Tipperary inter-county hurlers
All-Ireland Senior Hurling Championship winners
People educated at Our Lady's Secondary School, Templemore